Salkin is a surname. Notable people with the surname include:

Allen Salkin (born ?), American investigative journalist and blogger
Patricia Salkin (born ?), American academic, law professor, and blogger

Other
Salkin & Linoff ( 1920s–80s), U.S. retail clothier based in Minnesota